Toll's Meadow, Wymondham is a   Local Nature Reserve in Wymondham in Norfolk. It is owned by Wymondham Town Council and managed by Wymondham Town Council and Norfolk County Council.

The River Tiffey runs through this site, which has wet meadow and woodland. There is a variety of small birds and mammals include muntjac and roe deer,  bank voles and common shrews.

There is access from Cemetery Lane and from London Road.

References

Local Nature Reserves in Norfolk